Corey Luke Wingard is a former Australian politician. He was a Liberal member of the South Australian House of Assembly from the 2014 state election, representing Mitchell until 2018 and Gibson until his defeat in 2022. Wingard served as the Minister for Recreation, Sport and Racing in the Marshall Ministry from 2018 to 2022. He previously served as the Minister for Police, Emergency Services and Correctional Services.

Following a Cabinet reshuffle on 28 July 2020, Wingard was appointed the Minister for Infrastructure and Transport, and was sworn in on the following day.

Wingard previously was a journalist and sports presenter, ran a media advice company, and worked for senator Sean Edwards.

Wingard graduated from the University of South Australia with a degree in exercise and sports. He worked for the SANFL before moving into television where he worked for the Nine Network on the Wide World of Sports and FOX Sports. He later joined Network 10 where he was a sports producer/presenter and was a host and commentator for major events such as the Commonwealth Games, IPL cricket, AFL and the National Basketball League.

Wingard was cleared of misconduct by Premier Steven Marshall following the report of a private investigator after accusations of bullying and intimidatory behavior by Leah Cassidy, chief executive of Sport SA.

References

External links

Members of the South Australian House of Assembly
Living people
21st-century Australian politicians
University of South Australia alumni
Year of birth missing (living people)
10 Sport
Australian television presenters